Antònia Fontanillas Borràs (29 May 1917 – 23 September 2014) was a Spanish Catalan seamstress, anarcho-syndicalist, trade unionist, and militant anarchist from Palafrugell. She was a leader within various organizations including Libertarian Youth of Palafrugell, Solidaritat Internacional Antifeixista (SIA), and Confederación Nacional del Trabajo (CNT). With her mother, she fled Catalonia in 1939, setting in Toulouse. She returned to Spain on several occasions, bringing propaganda, weapons, or money. Fontanillas died in Dreux in 2014.

References

1917 births
2014 deaths
People from Girona
Women trade unionists
Anarcho-syndicalists
Anarchists from Catalonia
Mujeres Libres
Spanish trade union leaders
Spanish tailors
Confederación Nacional del Trabajo members